The mezzo-soprano saxophone, sometimes called the F alto saxophone, is an instrument in the saxophone family. It is in the key of F, pitched a whole tone above the alto saxophone. Its size and the sound are similar to the E alto, although the upper register sounds more like a B soprano. Very few mezzo-sopranos exist—they were only produced in 1928 and 1929 by the C.G. Conn company. They were not popular and did not sell widely, as their production coincided with the Wall Street Crash of 1929 and the Great Depression. Harsh economic conditions forced Conn to reduce the range of saxophones they produced to the most popular models.

Conn used the surplus stock of mezzo-sopranos to teach instrument repair in Conn's Elkhart workshops. Typically, a Conn instructor would deliberately damage the mezzo-sopranos (e.g. dropping them onto a concrete floor) and the students would then be tasked with repairing them. The repeated wear and tear of these actions eventually destroyed the saxophones.

Conn also developed the Conn-O-Sax, a straight mezzo-soprano in F with a bulbous bell similar to a heckelphone, intended to imitate the form, range and timbre of the cor anglais. Only a small number were ever made, between 1929 and 1930.

The mezzo-soprano is the only saxophone pitched in F that has ever been built, apart from prototypes of an F baritone. Although Maurice Ravel's 1928 orchestral work Boléro calls for a sopranino saxophone in F, it is unlikely the instrument ever existed; the part is usually performed on an E♭ sopranino or B♭ soprano.

Notable players of the mezzo-soprano saxophone include Anthony Braxton, James Carter, Vinny Golia, Jon Irabagon, and Jay Easton.

More recently, a mezzo-soprano in the key of G has been produced by Danish woodwind technician Peter Jessen, most notably played by Benjamin Koppel and Joe Lovano. Their collaboration can be heard on "The Mezzo Sax Encounter" (vinyl and CD, 2016) where Koppel and Lovano are accompanied by pianist Kenny Werner, bassist Scott Colley and drummer Johnathan Blake. This instrument is more in the timbral quality of the B soprano saxophone.

In classical music
It was asked for by Richard Strauss in his Sinfonia Domestica written in 1903-1904, which includes parts for four saxophones in the music, including an alto saxophone in F.

References

External links
Jay C. Easton - modern & unusual woodwinds Jay Easton's alto and mezzo-soprano page, with photographs and sound clips.

Saxophones
F instruments